Caloptilia scansoria is a moth of the family Gracillariidae. It is known from Himachal Pradesh, India.

References

scansoria
Moths of Asia
Moths described in 1910